Saw Ahlwan (also known as Ale Pyinthe ("Queen of the Central Palace")) was a queen consort of kings Naratheinkha and Sithu II of the Pagan Dynasty of Myanmar (Burma).

The queen was the elder of the two daughters of Yazathu and Eindawthe, niece of queens Taung Pyinthe and Khin U. Chronicles simply refer to her as Ale Pyinthe ("Queen of the Central Palace") but according to an inscription from Sithu II's reign, her title or personal name appears to be Saw Ahlwan (or Saw Hteikhta (စောထိပ်ထား) in modern Burmese). She had a daughter named Thatti-Kami with Sithu II. She died during the reign of Sithu II (after the death of Queen Weluwaddy in 1186), and was succeeded by another queen as the Queen of the Central Palace.

References

Bibliography
 
 
 
 

Queens consort of Pagan
12th-century Burmese women